The GER Class C72 was a class of thirty  steam locomotives designed by A. J. Hill for the Great Eastern Railway. They passed to the London and North Eastern Railway (LNER) at the 1923 grouping and received the LNER classification J68.

History
These locomotives were an improved version of the Class S56 tanks, and the final development of James Holden's Class T18 tank locomotives, sharing the same  cylinders,  driving wheels, and  wheelbase. There were three orders, each of ten locomotives, all built at Stratford Works between 1912 and 1923. The first batch were built as suburban passenger tanks and were fitted with Westinghouse air brakes. The second and third batches were built as shunting tanks and were fitted with steam locomotive brakes and vacuum train brakes.

The last batch did not emerge from Stratford until after the grouping.

One locomotive was lent to the War Department in October 1939, and sold 12 months later, It was used on the Longmoor Military Railway before being moved to the Bicester Central Ordnance Depot, and then the Military Port No. 1, Faslane. The remaining locomotives were renumbered 8638–8666 in order of construction. At nationalisation in 1948 they passed to British Railways, who added 60000 to their numbers. Post war withdrawals started in 1958, and all were gone by 1961.

References

External links

 — Great Eastern Railway Society
The Hill J68 (GER Class C72) 0-6-0T Locomotives — LNER Encyclopedia

C72
0-6-0T locomotives
Railway locomotives introduced in 1912
War Department locomotives
Scrapped locomotives
Standard gauge steam locomotives of Great Britain